SchoolTube is a free K-12 video community based in St. Louis, Missouri. The company was founded in 2007 by Carl Arizpe and his son, Andrew.

Access in schools 
SchoolTube has traction with a broad base of the American learning community. All student-generated content is teacher moderated. As of 2013, there are registered SchoolTube users in over 50,000 K-12 schools in the United States who are uploading, on average, 1,000 videos a day. Most schools have blocked commercial video platforms from the classroom due to inappropriate content. SchoolTube has been granted this access due to a safe moderation process that ensures all user-generated content is appropriate for the K-12 environment. SchoolTube is endorsed by many of the top national education associations. Some top endorsers include the American Association of School Librarians and the National Science Teachers Association.

Moderation process 
SchoolTube's uses a moderation process which it claims makes it safe for usage within K-12 classrooms. When a student decides to upload a video, a teacher or administrator from that student's school must approve the video before it will be made live on the site. This allows schools to create strong video-sharing communities. Schools also have the option to limit the video viewing to its own school. This moderation process has led students to create higher-quality work.

References

External links 
 SchoolTube website

American educational websites
Video hosting
Internet properties established in 2007